The 129th Massachusetts General Court, consisting of the Massachusetts Senate and the Massachusetts House of Representatives, met in 1882 during the governorship of John Davis Long. Robert R. Bishop served as president of the Senate and Charles J. Noyes served as speaker of the House.

Senators

Representatives

See also
 1882 Massachusetts gubernatorial election
 47th United States Congress
 List of Massachusetts General Courts

References

Further reading

External links

 
 

Political history of Massachusetts
Massachusetts legislative sessions
massachusetts
1882 in Massachusetts